Jérôme Scolan (born 27 June 1988) is a French professional footballer who plays as a goalkeeper for Championnat National 2 club Hyères.

Club career
After making his debut in the French lower divisions, Scolan joined Clermont in 2013, as a backup for Fabien Farnolle. He made his full professional debut in a 2–0 Ligue 2 victory over CA Bastia in December 2013.

References

External links
 
 
 Jérôme Scolan foot-national.com Profile

1988 births
Living people
Association football goalkeepers
French footballers
Ligue 2 players
Championnat National 2 players
Championnat National 3 players
SC Toulon players
US Raon-l'Étape players
Clermont Foot players
Hyères FC players